Highway 34 (AR 34, Ark. 34, and Hwy. 34) is an east–west state highway in the Upper Arkansas Delta. The route of  begins at US Highway 412 (US 412) and U.S. Route 67 Business (US 67B). The route is maintained by the Arkansas State Highway and Transportation Department (AHTD).

Route description
AR 34 begins in Walnut Ridge and runs northeast under US 67 (Future I-57), meeting and concurring with AR 231 until O'Kean. AR 34 meets AR 90 in O'Kean, and runs with it northeast to Delaplaine. The route turns south in Delaplaine to Evening Star, when it heads east to meet AR 141 in Beech Grove. AR 34 continues east to meet AR 135 north of Oak Grove Heights, which it follows north until Lafe. AR 34 then runs east to Marmaduke, where it crosses US 49/AR 1. The route continues east to the community of Fritz, where AR 34 meets AR 139 and terminates.

History
Highway 34 is one of the original 1926 Arkansas state highways.

Major intersections

See also

 List of state highways in Arkansas

References

External links

Crowley's Ridge Parkway
034
Transportation in Lawrence County, Arkansas
Transportation in Randolph County, Arkansas
Transportation in Greene County, Arkansas